The 1992 United States presidential election in Michigan took place on November 3, 1992, as part of the 1992 United States presidential election. Voters chose 18 representatives, or electors to the Electoral College, who voted for president and vice president.

Michigan was won by Governor Bill Clinton (D-Arkansas) with 43.77% of the popular vote over incumbent President George H. W. Bush (R-Texas) with 36.38%. Businessman Ross Perot (I-Texas) finished in third, with 19.30% of the popular vote. Clinton ultimately won the national vote, defeating incumbent President Bush. This was the first time that a Democratic presidential candidate carried the state since Hubert Humphrey in 1968. It would not vote Republican again until 2016. , this is the last time that Oakland County voted for a Republican presidential candidate and the last time that Charlevoix County voted for a Democratic presidential candidate. Michigan voted most similarly to the national results of the election.

Results

Results by county

See also
 Presidency of Bill Clinton
 United States presidential elections in Michigan

References

Michigan
1992
1992 Michigan elections